Victoria boliviana, or the Bolivian waterlily is a new species of water lily within the genus Victoria in the family Nymphaeaceae. It is the newest described species of the genus and its largest member in size and was officially identified in 2022. In January 2023, the species was awarded three Guinness World Record titles for world's largest waterlily species, world's largest waterlily leaf and world's largest undivided leaf, with the latter two specifically recognizing a specimen grown in 2012 at La Rinconada Gardens in Santa Cruz, Bolivia.

Etymology
The specific epithet boliviana references its origin in Bolivia.

Description
The leaves of Victoria boliviana regularly grow to around 3m wide; the largest recorded leaf measured 3.2m across from a plant in the La Rinconada Gardens in Bolivia. It is clear from the photograph of this largest leaf that the rims were not included in the measurement.   If the  rims are included, the leaf is then fully  in width, equal to the largest leaves of Gunnera manicata. The leaves are so large that they are capable of carrying the weight of an adult human, as proven by Alberto Trinco, conservatory manager for the Princess of Wales Conservatory at the Royal Botanic Gardens, Kew.

The lily produces multiple flowers in succession each year, with each opening one at a time and blooming for just two nights. The flowers, which are covered in prickles, are white and subsequently turn pink.

The chromosome count is 2n = 2x = 24.

Taxonomy
The issue of Victoria taxonomy is complicated through the loss of the type collections of other species. In addition, the plants are difficult to collect, due to their enormous size, prickles and their susceptibility to disintegrating, before the material could be properly conserved.

Delimitation from Victoria cruziana and Victoria amazonica
Victoria boliviana differs in many different features from the remaining two species of the genus. This includes its larger seed and ovule size (each seed being about 70% longer and wider, and over four times as voluminous as those of V. amazonica and V. cruziana), as well as its moderate or intermediate rim height of the leaf lamina. Also, unlike V. amazonica and V. cruziana, it lacks trichomes (plant hairs) on its outer tepals and on the ovary. The chromosome count is shared with Victoria cruziana, but differs from Victoria amazonica. It is also most similar to Victoria cruziana. Some features have an overlapping range, however in combination many differences can be observed.

Position within the genus Victoria
This species is the sister group to Victoria cruziana. This leads to the following relationships:

Ecology
This species is native to the Bolivian wetlands. It has been observed to be pollinated by beetles.

History
Specimens of this species have remained unrecognised as distinct entities for a long time, although they were present in collections, including a drawing held in Kew from an 1845 specimen. Bolivian seeds were donated to the Royal Botanic Gardens Kew in 2016. Based on this material genetic studies were made, which resulted in the recognition of this third Victoria species as a separate and distinct entity.

Conservation
This species is estimated to fall between the IUCN Red List categories Vulnerable (VU) and Endangered (EN). There are five known populations present in Bolivia.

Gallery

References

Nymphaeaceae
Aquatic plants
Flora of Bolivia
Plants described in 2022